John William Finn (24 July 1909 – 27 May 2010) was a sailor in the United States Navy who, as a chief petty officer, received the United States military's highest decoration, the Medal of Honor, for his actions during the attack on Pearl Harbor in World War II. As a chief aviation ordnanceman stationed at Naval Air Station Kaneohe Bay, he earned the medal by manning a machine gun from an exposed position throughout the attack, despite being repeatedly wounded. He continued to serve in the Navy and in 1942 was commissioned an ensign. In 1947 he was reverted to chief petty officer, eventually rising to lieutenant before his 1956 retirement. In his later years he made many appearances at events celebrating veterans. At the time of his death, Finn was the oldest living Medal of Honor recipient, the last living recipient from the attack on Pearl Harbor, and the last living United States Navy recipient of World War II.

Early life
Born on 24 July 1909, in Compton, California, Finn dropped out of school after the seventh grade. He enlisted in the Navy in July 1926, shortly before his seventeenth birthday, and completed recruit training in San Diego. After a brief stint with a ceremonial guard company, he attended General Aviation Utilities Training at Naval Station Great Lakes, graduating in December. By April 1927 he was back in the San Diego area, having been assigned to Naval Air Station North Island. He initially worked in aircraft repair before becoming an aviation ordnanceman and working on anti-aircraft guns.

Finn was promoted to chief petty officer (E-7, the highest enlisted rank in the Navy at that time) in 1935 after only nine years of active duty. He later commented on his promotions, "Everybody thought I was a boy wonder. I was just in the right place at the right time." As a chief, Finn served with patrol squadrons in San Diego, Washington, and Panama.

Attack on Pearl Harbor

By December 1941, Finn was stationed at Naval Air Station Kaneohe Bay on the island of Oahu in Hawaii. As a chief aviation ordnanceman, he was in charge of twenty men whose primary task was to maintain the weapons of VP-11, a PBY Catalina flying boat squadron. At 7:48 a.m. on the morning of Sunday, 7 December 1941, Finn was at his home, about a mile from the aircraft hangars, when he heard the sound of gunfire. Finn recalled how a neighbor was the first to alert him, when she knocked on his door saying, "They want you down at the squadron right away!" He drove to the hangars, catching sight of Japanese planes in the sky on the way, and found that the airbase was being attacked, with most of the PBYs already on fire.

Finn's men were trying to fight back by using the machine guns mounted in the PBYs, either by firing from inside the flaming planes or by detaching the guns and mounting them on improvised stands. Finn later explained that one of the first things he did was to take control of a machine gun from his squadron's painter. "I said, 'Alex, let me take that gun' ... knew that I had more experience firing a machine gun than a painter."

Finding a movable tripod platform used for gunnery training, Finn attached the .50 caliber machine gun and pushed the platform into an open area, from which he had a clear view of the attacking aircraft. He fired on the Japanese planes for the next two hours, even after being seriously wounded, until the attack had ended. In total, he received 21 distinct wounds, including a bullet through his right foot and an injury to his left shoulder, which caused him to lose feeling in his left arm.

"I got that gun and I started shooting at Jap planes," Finn said in a 2009 interview. "I was out there shooting the Jap planes and just every so often I was a target for some," he said, "In some cases, I could see their [the Japanese pilots'] faces."

Despite his wounds, Finn returned to the hangars later that day. After receiving medical treatment, he helped arm the surviving American planes. His actions earned him the first Medal of Honor to be awarded in World War II. He was formally presented with the decoration on 14 September 1942, by Admiral Chester Nimitz, for courage and valor beyond the call of duty. The ceremony took place in Pearl Harbor on board .

In 1942 Finn was commissioned, and served as a Limited Duty Officer with the rank of ensign. In 1947 he was reverted to his enlisted rank of chief petty officer, eventually becoming a lieutenant with Bombing Squadron VB-102 and aboard . He retired from the Navy as a lieutenant in September 1956.

Later life and legacy

From 1956 until shortly before his death, Finn resided on a  ranch in Live Oak Springs, near Pine Valley, California. He and his wife became foster parents to five Native American children, causing him to be embraced by the Campo Band of Diegueño Mission Indians, a tribe of Kumeyaay people in San Diego. His wife, Alice Finn, died in 1998. John Finn was a member of the John Birch Society.

In his retirement he made many appearances at events honoring veterans. On 25 March 2009, he attended National Medal of Honor Day ceremonies at Arlington National Cemetery. With the aid of walking sticks, he stood beside U.S. President Barack Obama during a wreath-laying ceremony at the Tomb of the Unknown Soldier. Later that day, Finn was a guest at the White House. It was his first visit to the White House, and his first time meeting a sitting president.

On 27 June 2009, a crowd of over 2,000 made up of family, friends and well-wishers came to Pine Valley to celebrate Finn's 100th birthday. The Association of Aviation Ordnancemen presented him with an American flag which had flown on each of the 11 aircraft carriers then in active service.

When called a hero during a 2009 interview Finn responded:

Finn died at age 100 on the morning of 27 May 2010, at the Chula Vista Veterans Home. He was buried beside his wife at the Campo Indian Reservation's cemetery, after a memorial service in El Cajon. He was the last surviving Medal of Honor recipient from the attack on Pearl Harbor, the oldest living recipient, and the only aviation ordnanceman to have ever received the medal. Upon his death, fellow World War II veteran Barney F. Hajiro became the oldest living Medal of Honor recipient.

Namesake

The headquarters building for Commander, Patrol and Reconnaissance Force, United States Pacific Fleet at Marine Corps Base Hawaii Kaneohe was named in Finn's honor, and in 2009 a boat used to bring visitors to the USS Arizona Memorial was also named after him. In that same year, part of Historic U.S. Route 80, was named "John Finn Route". Three buildings in the former Naval Training Center San Diego were named the John and Alice Finn Office Plaza. On 15 February 2012, the U.S. Secretary of the Navy Ray Mabus announced that an  would be named  in his honor.

Awards and decorations
Finn received the following awards and decorations:

Medal of Honor citation

See also

List of Medal of Honor recipients for World War II
List of Medal of Honor recipients for the Attack on Pearl Harbor

References

External links

1909 births
2010 deaths
United States Navy personnel of World War II
United States Navy Medal of Honor recipients
United States Navy sailors
United States Navy officers
American centenarians
Men centenarians
People from Chula Vista, California
Military personnel from California
World War II recipients of the Medal of Honor
John Birch Society members
Attack on Pearl Harbor